is a Prefectural Natural Park in southern Chiba Prefecture, Japan. First designated for protection in 1935, the park's central features are the Mineoka Mountains. The park spans the municipalities of Kamogawa and Minamibōsō.

See also
 National Parks of Japan

References

External links
  Map of Mineokasankei Prefectural Natural Park

Parks and gardens in Chiba Prefecture
Protected areas established in 1935
1935 establishments in Japan